Glenea wiedenfeldi is a species of beetle in the family Cerambycidae. It was described by Per Olof Christopher Aurivillius in 1911 and is known from Papua New Guinea.

References

wiedenfeldi
Beetles described in 1911